MTK Budapest is a sport society in Budapest, Hungary. It may also refer to:

 MTK Budapest (women's handball) - women's handball club
 MTK Budapest (canoeing) - canoeing/kayaking club
 MTK Budapest (fencing) - fencing club
 MTK Budapest (women's basketball) - women's basketball club

See also
 MTK Budapest FC - men's football club
 MTK Budapest FC (women) - women's football club